Archibald Clark Robertson (15 September 1929 – 28 January 1978) was a Scottish footballer who spent most of his career with Clyde, firstly as an inside right and latterly as manager.

Playing career

Club
Robertson joined Clyde from Junior side Rutherglen Glencairn in 1947, on a part-time basis as he continued his studies towards a degree in chemistry. He spent the next 14 seasons with the Bully Wee, during which time he experienced relegation on three occasions, although he also helped the side win the Division Two title twice, in 1951–52 and 1956–57.

Robertson also enjoyed success with Clyde in the Scottish Cup. In the 1955 final he scored Clyde's equalising goal direct from a corner kick in the 88th minute, forcing a 1–1 draw with Celtic. Clyde went on to win the replay 1–0 with a goal by Tommy Ring. He also played in the 1958 Cup final when Clyde defeated Hibernian 1–0.

He eventually left the club when signed by Morton for £1,000 in the autumn of his career. A teammate was Allan McGraw who stated that he "Learnt a lot" from Robertson. He spent two seasons in Greenock before retiring in 1963.

International
In the 1950s, Robertson along with Harry Haddock, and Tommy Ring, were three of 49 junior players to later earn full international honours for that decade.

While with Clyde, Robertson earned 5 caps for the Scotland national football team and played in the 1958 FIFA World Cup in Sweden. He also earned selection for the Scottish League representative side on two occasions.

Manager
Robertson began a managerial career with Second Division Cowdenbeath in 1964 and spent three and a half mid-table seasons with the Blue Brazil. In January 1968 he succeeded Davie White as manager of old club Clyde but was not able to replicate White's 1966-67 third-place finish as Clyde's league form gradually declined in the late 1960s and early 1970s. They eventually experienced relegation in the 1971–72 season and despite leading his team to the Second Division title the following campaign, Robertson ended his association with the club in 1973. His final footballing role was as Tottenham Hotspur's Scottish scout.

Other work
Throughout his career, Robertson combined his footballing role with another career. Following his graduation he worked in the scientific branch of the National Coal Board, while in later years he was a science teacher at Hunter High School in East Kilbride. One of his pupils was future Scotland striker Ally McCoist, who credited the guidance of Robertson (in his role as the school team's coach) in his early development as a player.

Honours

Player
Clyde
 Scottish Cup: 1954–55, 1957–58
 Scottish Division Two: 1951–52, 1956–57
 Supplementary Cup: 1951–52
 Glasgow Cup: 1951–52, 1958–59; runner-up: 1956–57
 Glasgow Charity Cup: 1951–52 (shared), 1957–58; Runner-up 1958–59

Morton
 Renfrewshire Cup: 1961–62

Manager
Clyde
 Scottish Division Two: 1972–73
 Glasgow Cup: Runner-up 1970–71

References

External links

Scotland national team statistics at Scotland Football Stats.
Scotland national team statistics at londonhearts.com

1929 births
1978 deaths
People from Busby, East Renfrewshire
Scottish footballers
Scottish football managers
Scotland international footballers
1958 FIFA World Cup players
Clyde F.C. players
Rutherglen Glencairn F.C. players
Scottish Junior Football Association players
Greenock Morton F.C. players
Cowdenbeath F.C. managers
Clyde F.C. managers
Association football inside forwards
Scottish Football League players
Scottish Football League representative players
Scottish Football League managers
Cowdenbeath F.C. players
People associated with the coal industry
Scottish chemists
Place of death missing
Tottenham Hotspur F.C. non-playing staff
Sportspeople from East Renfrewshire